This article is a list containing lists of television channels.

Lists of television channels by continent 

 Africa
 Asia
 Europe
 North America
 Oceania
 Latin America

Lists of television channels by country 

 Afghanistan
 Australia
 Bangladesh
 Belarus
 Belgium
 Brazil
 Bulgaria
 Canada
 Caribbean Islands
 Chile
 Croatia
 China
 Germany
 Hungary
 India
 Indonesia
 Ireland
 Italy
 Malaysia
 Mexico
 Moldova
 New Zealand
 Pakistan
 Romania
 Singapore
 Serbia
 South Africa
 Thailand
 United Kingdom
Vietnam

United States
Over-the-air television networks
Pay television channels

Defunct networks
List of defunct television networks in the United States

Lists of television channels by language 

 Arabic
 Azerbaijani
 Bengali
 Catalan
 Chinese
 Croatian
 Czech
 Estonian
 French
 German
 Greek
 Hungarian
 Icelandic
 Irish
 Israeli
 Italian
 Japanese
 Korean
 Kurdish
 Latvian
 Lithuanian
 Malay
 Nepali
 Norwegian
 Pashto
 Persian
 Polish
 Portuguese
 Romanian
 Russian
 Scottish
 Serbian
 Slovak
 Slovene
 Spanish
 Swedish
 Tajik
 Turkish
 Ukrainian
 Urdu
 Uzbek
 Welsh

Indian

 Assamese
 Bengali
 Bhojpuri
 English
 Gujarati
 Hindi
 Kannada
 Konkani
 Malayalam
 Marathi
 Meitei (Manipuri)
 Odia
 Punjabi
 Tamil
 Telugu

By language family

 Celtic

See also 

 List of cable television companies
 List of television networks by country
 List of fictional television stations
 Television channel frequencies